The Arkansas-Pine Bluff Golden Lions  (also UAPB) represent the University of Arkansas at Pine Bluff in Pine Bluff, Arkansas in intercollegiate athletics. They field sixteen teams including men and women's basketball, cross country, tennis, and indoor and outdoor track and field; women's-only softball, volleyball, and soccer; and men's-only baseball, football, and golf. The Golden Lions and Lady Lions compete in NCAA Division I and are members of the Southwestern Athletic Conference.

Sports sponsored

References

External links